Vellozia andina is a species of plant in the order Pandanales.

Distribution
The plant is native to the Central Andes mountains, within the  Department of Santa Cruz, in Bolivia, South America.

Description
It is distinguished by its short, stout and trigonous stems and by the irregular pollen aggregates of more than eight grains.

It is a poikilohydrous and poikilochlorophyllous type of resurrection plant.

References

External links
PlantList.org

Velloziaceae
Flora of Bolivia
Flora of the Andes
Plants described in 2001